Wade Rousselot (born April 13, 1959) is an American politician who served in the Oklahoma House of Representatives from the 12th district from 2004 to 2016.

References

1959 births
Living people
Democratic Party members of the Oklahoma House of Representatives